Avtonom is a Russian Christian male first name. Its feminine version is Avtonoma. The name is derived from the Greek word autonomous, meaning one living by one's own laws. "Avtonom" continued to be a form used by the Russian Orthodox Church, having replaced an earlier form Autonom.

Its colloquial variant is Avtomon.

The diminutives of "Avtonom" are Avtonomka, Avtom, Avtoma, Toma, Avtya, and Noma.

The patronymics derived from "Avtonom" are "" (Avtonomovich; masculine) and its colloquial form "" (Avtonomych), and "" (Avtonomovna; feminine).

Last names derived from this first name include Avtonomov and Antomanov.

People with this first name 

Avtonom Golovin (1667–1720), Russian military leader

References

Notes

Additional reading
[1] А. В. Суперанская (A. V. Superanskaya). "Современный словарь личных имён: Сравнение. Происхождение. Написание" (Modern Dictionary of First Names: Comparison. Origins. Spelling). Айрис-пресс. Москва, 2005. 
[2] А. В. Суперанская (A. V. Superanskaya). "Словарь русских имён" (Dictionary of Russian Names). Издательство Эксмо. Москва, 2005. 
Н. А. Петровский (N. A. Petrovsky). "Словарь русских личных имён" (Dictionary of Russian First Names). ООО Издательство "АСТ". Москва, 2005. 
И. М. Ганжина (I. M. Ganzhina). "Словарь современных русских фамилий" (Dictionary of Modern Russian Last Names). Москва, 2001. 

